Paul Finley may refer to:

Paul Findley (1921–2019), American politician
Paul Finlay, Irish Gaelic footballer